Jade Picon Froes (born in 24 September 2001) is a Brazilian digital influencer, actress,  businesswoman, model, who gained notoriety in digital media. As a child she started her career as a model and rose to prominence after her appearances in videos and posts made by her brother Leo Picon. She was best known for participating in the twenty-second edition of Big Brother Brasil, on TV Globo.

Life and career

Picon was born in the city of São Paulo on September 24, 2001, the youngest daughter of Carlos Picon, a businessman, and Monica Santini Froes, an agronomist. His brother, Léo Picon, is a digital influencer, who was born in 1996. Jade started working as a photo model as a baby, dedicating herself to such a career until she was 7 years old.After that, she made appearances in videos and posts made by her brother on Orkut and YouTube, which got a lot of repercussion. This favored the career of Picon, who at the age of 13 already had his financial independence, and over the years had also gained millions of followers on his social networks. In 2019, she launched her own clothing brand, Jade² (also stylized as JadeJade). At age 20, Picon became a millionaire.

In 2022, she was chosen for the twenty-second season of Big Brother Brazil. One of the participants of the "Camarote" group, which brings together celebrities (already known in the media and by the public) invited directly by the program's team. She was the 7th eliminated with 84.93% of the votes in a wall against the actor and singer Arthur Aguiar and the biologist and professor Jessilane, finishing in 14th place. Subsequently, Picon made her acting debut after being cast as Chiara Guerra in TV Globo's telenovela Travessia.[14] There were criticisms around her casting, to which reviewers stated that she had no DRT or experience in the area of expertise.

Filmography

Awards and Nominations

References

External links
 

Living people
2001 births
21st-century Brazilian actresses
21st-century Brazilian businesswomen
21st-century Brazilian businesspeople
People from São Paulo